Founded in 1961, the American College of Neuropsychopharmacology (ACNP) is a professional organization of leading brain and behavior scientists. The principal functions of the college are research and education.  Their goals in research are to offer investigators an opportunity for cross-disciplinary communication and to promote the application of various scientific disciplines to the study of the brain's effect on behavior, with a focus on mental illness of all forms.  Their educational goals are to encourage young scientists to enter research careers in neuropsychopharmacology and to develop and provide accurate information about behavioral disorders and their pharmacological treatment.

Organization 
The college is an honorific society.  Members are selected primarily on the basis of their original research contributions to the broad field of neuroscience.  The membership of the college is drawn from scientists in multiple fields including behavioral pharmacology, brain imaging, chronobiology, clinical psychopharmacology, epidemiology, genetics, molecular biology, neurochemistry, neuroendocrinology, neuroimmunology, neurology, neurophysiology, pharmacology, psychiatry, and psychology.

Annual Meeting 
The Annual Meeting of the college is a closed meeting, only the ACNP members and their invited guests may attend. Because of the college's intense concern with, and involvement in, the education and training of tomorrow's brain scientists, the college selects a number of young scientists to be invited to the Annual Meeting through a competitive process open to all beginning researchers. This meeting, a cornucopia of state-of-the-art brain and behavior research world-wide, is designed to encourage dialogue, discussion, and synergy by those attending.

Awards 
The ACNP offers the following awards.

 Julius Axelrod Mentorship Award
 Daniel H. Efron Research Award
 Joel Elkes Research Award
 Barbara Fish Memorial Award
 Paul Hoch Distinguished Service Award
 Eva King Killam Research Award
 Dolores Shockley Diversity and Inclusion Advancement Award
 Media Award
 Public Service Award

Publication
The Nature Publishing Group journal Neuropsychopharmacology has been their official journal since it was first published in 1987.

References

See also
European Brain Council
European College of Neuropsychopharmacology
Neuropsychopharmacology (journal)

Neuropharmacology
Neuroscience organizations
Organizations based in Tennessee
Organizations established in 1961
Research organizations in the United States